GNV Sealand is a ferry operated by Grandi Navi Veloci between Valencia, Palma de Mallorca and Ibiza.

She entered service in 2009 on route from Zeebrügge to Rosyth operated by Norfolkline. In 2010 sold to DFDS Seaways and since 2011 on route Ventspils - Nynäshamn by Scandlines. In 2012 sold to Stena Line, operated the same route. Named the Scottish Viking.

History
Scottish Viking was constructed by the Visentini Shipyard in Italy in 2009 for Watling Street Ltd. During construction she was chartered to Norfolkline for services between Rosyth and Zeebrugge, which they took over from Superfast Ferries when they withdrew from the service. When MS Superfast X was sold to Veolia Transport in 2007, Scottish Viking entered service. Shortly after in July 2009, Norfolkline was bought by DFDS and later rebranded as DFDS Seaways in 2010 when Norfolkline along with DFDS Lisco and DFDS Tor Line were merged into DFDS Seaways to make one brand.
DFDS operated the vessel for a short time before they withdrew her and replaced her with a freight vessel when the route became freight only. She was chartered to Scandlines between the years of 2010 and 2011, and Stena Line took over the charter of the vessel in 2011. They continued the charter under their name, and the ship retained her original Norfolkline name (was not been renamed in between charters) until 2021, when she was named GNV Sealand.

Routes Served
Rosyth,  - Zeebrugge,  (2009-2010)Ventspils,  - Nynäshamn,  (2010–2021 July)Valencia,  - Palma de Mallorca,  - Ibiza,  (2022–present)

References

External links

Ferries of Spain
Ships built by Cantiere Navale Visentini
2008 ships